Ambulycini is a tribe of moths of the family Sphingidae first described by Arthur Gardiner Butler in 1876.

Taxonomy 
Genus Adhemarius Oitiaca, 1939
Genus Akbesia Rothschild & Jordan, 1903
Genus Ambulyx Westwood, 1847
Genus Amplypterus Hübner, 1819
Genus Barbourion Clark, 1934
Genus Batocnema Rothschild & Jordan, 1903
Genus Compsulyx Holloway, 1979
Genus Orecta Rothschild & Jordan, 1903
Genus Protambulyx Rothschild & Jordan, 1903
Genus Trogolegnum Rothschild & Jordan, 1903

Gallery

References

 
Smerinthinae
Taxa named by Arthur Gardiner Butler